Toton is a large village in the Borough of Broxtowe, Nottinghamshire, England.  The electoral ward of Toton and Chilwell Meadows population of this ward was 7,298 in the 2001 census.  It increased to 8,238 at the 2011 census.

Until 1974 Toton was part of Beeston and Stapleford Urban District, having been in Stapleford Rural District until 1935.  The border with Derbyshire is immediately to the west.

Toton is predominantly rural and is one of the main entrances to Chetwynd Barracks (also known as Chilwell Depot), which forms a boundary to the east, with the Midland Railway and Toton Sidings forming a boundary to the west.

History
Although the village of Toton has existed since at least Norman times, little is known of its history. It is known that Toton parish at one time encompassed a much larger area than is now apparent, including much of what is now Attenborough village, and shared a church (probably on the site of St. Mary's, Attenborough) with neighbouring Chilwell parish, an arrangement that was unusual for the times.

The village itself was for most of its history, small and dominated by agriculture.  Then it grew principally because of Toton Sidings (see Toton Traction Maintenance Depot), a huge marshalling yard of the Midland Railway, where coal from the Nottinghamshire Coal Field would be sorted before being sent to the United Kingdom.  Also, the area's population grew substantially during World War I when most of the area of level ground between Chilwell and Toton was occupied by the National Shell Filling Factory No. 6 and the original direct route between Chilwell and Toton became a gated military road, now known as Chetwynd Road. This site is now known as Chetwynd Barracks.

In the twentieth century the nature of the village therefore changed drastically.  Almost all the agricultural land (mostly orchards) to the north of the A6005 was converted into housing.  A few of the old orchard trees were retained in some gardens.  Most of the old farmhouses were demolished, and perhaps twelve buildings remain that are pre-1900.  Almost no visible traces remain of Toton's agricultural past.

The Toton Sidings site is popular with railway enthusiasts, who can often be seen with cameras and binoculars, viewing the sidings from the nearby A52, and the nearby Toton Bank, which gives a view of most of the depot.

Amenities

Parks and open space
Manor Park (built on the site of the old Manor Farm) is a popular council park, with well-maintained cricket and football pitches, tennis courts and a bowling green.  This joins onto Banks Road Open Area, an extended strip of land along and between the banks of the River Erewash and its overflow channel, and stretching up along Toton Bank. These areas are managed collectively as Toton Fields Local Nature Reserve.

Toton Washlands is a nature reserve created by the Environment Agency to the west of Toton Sidings, that serves as flood defence for the River Erewash and sits to the east of the Erewash Canal.  Although it is within the boundaries of Toton, due to the presence of the sidings it is only possible to access the area from neighbouring Long Eaton.

Schools
Toton has four schools: Banks Road Infant and Nursery School, Bispham Drive Junior School, Chetwynd Primary Academy and George Spencer Academy and Sixth Form.  In 2019 Chetwynd Primary Academy achieved an Ofsted Report of Outstanding.

Sports
Toton has its own cricket team and various football teams, such as Toton Tigers, Toton Tornadoes, Toton United, etc. most of which train at the local cricket ground of Beeston and Toton Sycamore Cricket Club or manor farm open space.  Toton also has a bowling green in which Toton Bowls Club are based, along with tennis courts and outdoor play areas.

Churches

Toton has three churches: St. Peter's (Church of England), the Church of Jesus Christ of Latter-day Saints and Toton Methodist Church.  Toton Methodist Church and St. Peter's are in a covenanted Churches Together relationship, working together frequently on various community activities.

Scout groups
Toton has two scout groups, which are First Toton, held at St Peters church, and Second Toton, held at Greenwood Community Centre.

Pubs
'The Cornmill' is a modern pub on Swiney Way, between Chilwell and Toton.  The Manor is a pub/restaurant in Toton.  A pub was built on Sandown Road as part of the new housing development in the mid-1950s.  Its completion coincided with the Russians' sending a satellite around the moon in 1959, and taking photographs of the far side.  The pub was hastily renamed 'The Other Side of the Moon'.  The pub is no longer there.

Transport

Buses
Barton Buses originally served Toton, with a direct service to Nottingham (route 1).  The village was also served by a direct bus to and from Stapleford.  Several changes were made during the 1990s and the first decade of the 21st century, resulting in significant parts of the village losing through service to Nottingham and Stapleford.  The Indigo and Skylink Nottingham buses operated by Trentbarton operate to Nottingham, stopping at Toton Corner and other stops along Nottingham Road.  Route 510 (from Beeston to Stapleford) now operates through Toton, and connects with the Toton Lane tram stop.

Nottingham Express Transit
A new line (two) of the Nottingham Express Transit is now open, terminating just to the south of Bardills Island (A52), at Toton Lane tram stop.  Trams were due to operate to and from the Toton Lane terminus by late 2014 but delays put this back until August 2015.  Due to the announcement of HS2 station to be built at Toton Sidings (just a short distance from the Toton Lane terminus) the tramline is planned to be extended to the station.  The tram will pass through the planned housing and hotel development and is shown on the application submission.

High Speed 2
Original plans for High Speed 2 Phase Two were to place a station on Toton Sidings. Access to A52 was to be built between Bardills/Toton roundabout and Junction 25 of the M1.

East Midlands Hub railway station was a planned development on the site of the former railway sidings, which was expected to open around 2032. It was to be served by High Speed 2 services to northern cities, and south to London and Birmingham. It was also meant to serve as a regional hub and an interchange between high speed services, local rail services, the Nottingham Express Transit network, and bus services.

The leg of the line between Birmingham and Leeds has since been scrapped.

Borough councillors
The borough ward is currently served by three Conservative councillors: Lee Fletcher, Stephanie Kerry and Halimah Khaled MBE.  All three were re-elected in May 2019.  They hold regular Community Action Team Meetings (CAT).

References

External links

Villages in Nottinghamshire
Railway towns in England
Places in the Borough of Broxtowe